Richard Wilson is a Canadian politician elected in the 2019 Alberta general election to represent the electoral district of Maskwacis-Wetaskiwin in the 30th Alberta Legislature. Wilson previously served as a councillor for the County of Wetaskiwin as well as on the Wetaskiwin Regional Public School Board On April 30, 2019, he was appointed to the Executive Council of Alberta as the Minister of Indigenous Relations.

References

United Conservative Party MLAs
Living people
21st-century Canadian politicians
1950s births
Members of the Executive Council of Alberta